The Metropolitan Learning Center (MLC) is an alternative public school serving K–12 students in Portland, Oregon, United States.

The school is located adjacent to Couch Park. The playground at Couch Park doubles as the playground for the school.

History

Couch School
In 1913 Portland voters were asked to consider a school budget that included new construction to modernize Portland schools. The dilapidated "Couch School", an 1883 structure that had recently closed to contain an outbreak of smallpox, would be torn down, and a new Couch School would be built in 1914 at a cost of $177,000.

The architect for the new school was Floyd Naramore, newly employed as architect and superintendent for Portland Public Schools. Naramore was responsible for many Portland school designs including Benson Polytechnic High School and Shattuck School. Reflecting modern standards of the day, Tudor Revival was chosen as the style for Couch School.

Both the 1883 school and the 1914 school were named for Captain John Heard Couch, an early settler whose land became known as the Couch Addition when Northwest Portland was platted.

Metropolitan Learning Center
In 1968, Portland Public Schools began an experimental study environment at Couch School designated the Metropolitan Learning Center. Starting with 150 students from Couch School and other sites, the center encouraged students to create their own instructional environment—students were free to pursue subjects that interested them rather than following a strict curriculum set by teachers. Moreover, students were not grouped by age and did not receive grades. The center worked with Portland State College, later Portland State University, and Reed College to offer student teachers a central role in classroom instruction.

Couch School and MLC shared the same principal, Amasa Gilman. According to Gilman, the plan resulted in fewer discipline problems and higher attendance than at the conventional Couch School. Gilman continued as principal of MLC until 1975, when Portland Public Schools transferred him to a new location. His removal sparked protests among MLC students and staff.

Eventually, the distinction between the conventional Couch School and the experimental learning center it was hosting was dropped, and the entire school came to be known as the Metropolitan Learning Center.

In 2016, the Northwest District gas explosion occurred two and a half blocks away from MLC while many 10th grade students were taking their PSAT/NMSQT tests. Students were evacuated to the school district headquarters.

Student profile
In 2016, 91% of the school's seniors received their high school diploma. Of 35 students, 33 graduated and 2 dropped out. The student population during the same year was 79.9% White, 9.1% Hispanic, 2.1% Asian, 1.6% African American, 0.2% Native American, and 7% mixed race. As of 2017, less than five percent of MLC students are learning English as a second language.

In 2019, 17 out of 21 students graduated, and 4 dropped out.

Academics 
According to MLC's 2017–2018 school profile, the school began "as a challenge to the notion that educational rewards must be
extrinsic and maintains the belief that personal relationships between staff and students are
paramount." Accordingly, MLC does not issue letter grades, instead using a four category rating system ("Exceeds", "Proficient", "Developing", or "Does Not Meet") to evaluate students. Each category is assigned a grade point average range to show how the ratings can be translated onto a 4.0 scale.

Athletics and Extra-curriculars 
MLC had a short-lived high school basketball team called the Underdogs. Elementary and Middle schoolers often have their own rec sports teams through Portland Parks & Recreation.

Elementary and Middle school students sign up for electives which take place two or three times a week in the afternoon. Each term brings new elective choices which are taught by teachers, parents, older students, and other volunteers on a variety of subjects.

The High School has multiple clubs including a yearbook club.

In Popular Culture 
The beginning of the 1993 made-for-TV short film Without Warning: Terror in the Towers with James Avery, George Clooney, and Andre Braugher was filmed on the blacktop of MLC.

In Homeward Bound: The Incredible Journey, MLC is used as the interior of Jamie's school.

A scene in Drugstore Cowboy showed the characters escaping and passing MLC.

Some interior shots of Mr. Holland's Opus starring Richard Dreyfuss were filmed at MLC.

Notable alumni and faculty

Gallery

See also
Collegiate Gothic
National Register of Historic Places listings in Northwest Portland, Oregon
Northwest District Explosion

References

External links

Metropolitan Learning Center
Couch Addition Map

1915 establishments in Oregon
High schools in Portland, Oregon
Portland Public Schools (Oregon)
Historic district contributing properties in Oregon
Tudor Revival architecture in Oregon
Northwest District, Portland, Oregon
National Register of Historic Places in Portland, Oregon
School buildings on the National Register of Historic Places in Oregon